Turnor Lake is a lake in northern Saskatchewan, Canada. It is part of a series of connected lakes that flow into the Churchill River drainage system. These lakes from north to south are Wasekamio Lake, Turnor Lake, Frobisher Lake and Churchill Lake. 
The community of Turnor Lake which includes the Birch Narrows Dene Nation is located on the southern shore of Turnor Lake.  It is accessed by Highway 909 off of Highway 155

Fish Species
The lake's fish species include: walleye, sauger, yellow perch, northern pike, lake trout, lake whitefish, cisco, white sucker, longnose sucker and burbot.

See also
List of lakes of Saskatchewan
Turnor Lake, Saskatchewan

References

Lakes of Saskatchewan